Tirhuta is a Unicode block containing characters for Brahmi-derived Tirhuta script which was the primary writing system for Maithili in Bihar, India and Madhesh, Nepal until the 20th century.

Block

History
The following Unicode-related documents record the purpose and process of defining specific characters in the Tirhuta block:

References 

Unicode blocks